Márton Székely (born 2 January 1990) is a Hungarian handball player for Tatabánya KC and the Hungarian national team.

He represented Hungary at the 2019 World Men's Handball Championship.

Honours

Club
PLER KC
Magyar Kupa
: 2011

Balatonfüredi KSE
Nemzeti Bajnokság I
 : 2014

Grundfos Tatabánya KC
Nemzeti Bajnokság I
: 2017, 2018, 2019
Magyar Kupa
: 2017

Telekom Veszprém
SEHA League
: 2020

FC Porto
Portuguese League 
: 2021
Portuguese Cup
: 2021

RK Eurofarm Pelister
Macedonian Handball Super Cup 
: 2021

Individual
Hungarian Goalkeeper of the Year: 2018

References

External links

1990 births
Living people
Hungarian male handball players
Handball players from Budapest
FC Porto handball players
Veszprém KC players